Guus Kuijer (born 1 August 1942) is a Dutch author. He wrote books for children and adults, and is best known for the Madelief series of children's books. For his career contribution to "children's and young adult literature in the broadest sense" he won the Astrid Lindgren Memorial Award from the Swedish Arts Council in 2012, the biggest prize in children's literature. As a children's writer he was one of five finalists for the biennial, international Hans Christian Andersen Award in 2008.

Early life 

Guus Kuijer is born on 1 August 1942 in Amsterdam, Netherlands. His parents were members of the Catholic Apostolic Church, but in 2006 Kuijer explained that he doesn't remember ever believing in God.

He studied at the kweekschool in Doetinchem to become a teacher. From 1967 to 1973 he was a primary school teacher.

Writing career 

In 1968 he started writing short stories for the magazine Hollands Maandblad and in 1971 he published a collection of his short stories. In 1973 he stopped teaching in order to become a full-time writer and this year he published his first novel Het dochtertje van de wasvrouw.

In 1975 he published his first children's book Met de poppen gooien, for which he received a Gouden Griffel in 1976. This book was the first of five books about a girl named Madelief (lit. Daisy).

Stage & screen adaptations 

Years later, a television series Madelief (1994) and movie Scratches in the Table (1998) were made of his book series about Madelief (1975–1979). Of his book series Polleke (1999–2001) a movie Polleke (2003) and a television series Polleke (2005) were made.

In 2011 Australian Richard Tulloch translated The Book of Everything into English and adapted it into a very successful play produced in 2013 by the Melbourne Theatre Company.

Works 

 1971 – Rose, met vrome wimpers
 1973 – Het dochtertje van de wasvrouw
 1975 – De man met de hamer
 1975 – Een gat in de grens
 1975 – Met de poppen gooien
 1976 – Drie verschrikkelijke dagen
 1976 – Grote mensen, daar kan je beter soep van koken
 1977 – Pappa is een hond
 1977 – Op je kop in de prullenbak
 1978 – Krassen in het tafelblad
 1978 – Hoe Mieke Mom haar maffe moeder vindt
 1979 – Ik woonde in een leunstoel
 1979 – Een hoofd vol macaroni
 1980 – Wimpers, herziene druk van Rose, met vrome wimpers
 1980 – Het geminachte kind
 1980 – De tranen knallen uit mijn kop
 1983 – Crisis en kaalhoofdigheid
 1983 – Het grote boek van Madelief
 1983 – Eend voor eend
 1984 – De zwarte stenen
 1985 – Het land van de neushoornvogel
 1986 – De jonge prinsen
 1987 – Tin Toeval en de kunst van het verdwalen
 1987 – Tin Toeval en het geheim van Tweebeens-eiland
 1988 – Izebel van Tyrus
 1989 – Tin Toeval en de kunst van Madelief
 1989 – De redder van Afrika —about Jacobus Capitein
 1990 – Olle
 1992 – Het vogeltje van Amsterdam
 1993 – Tin Toeval in de onderwereld
 1996 – De grote Tin Toeval
 1996 – De verhalen van Jonathan
 1999 – Voor altijd samen, amen
 2000 – Het is fijn om er te zijn
 2000 – Het geluk komt als de donder
 2000 – Reukorgel
 2001 – Met de wind mee naar zee
 2001 – Ik ben Polleke hoor! (Kinderboekenweekgeschenk 2001)
 2003 – Polleke
 2004 – Het boek van alle dingen
 2006 – Hoe een klein rotgodje God vermoordde
 2007 – Het doden van een mens
 2009 – Hoe word ik gelukkig?
 2011 – Draaikonten en haatblaffers —about Benito Arias Montano and the origin of a tolerant society
 2012 – De Bijbel voor ongelovigen. Het Begin  - Genesis
 2013 – De Bijbel voor ongelovigen / 2. De Uittocht en de Intocht - Exodus, Jozua, Rechters
 2014 – De Bijbel voor ongelovigen / 3. Saul, David, Samuel en Ruth
 2015 – De Bijbel voor ongelovigen / 4. Koning David en de splitsing van het rijk
 2016 – De Bijbel voor ongelovigen / 5. De twee koninkrijken, Job en de profeten
 2016 – The Bible for Unbelievers, translated by Laura Watkinson

Awards 
 1976 – Gouden Griffel for Met de poppen gooien
 1977 – Zilveren Griffel for Grote mensen, daar kun je beter soep van koken
 1979 – Staatsprijs voor kinder- en jeugdliteratuur
 1979 – Gouden Griffel for Krassen in het tafelblad
 1984 – Zilveren Griffel for Eend voor eend
 1988 – Zilveren Griffel for Tin Toeval en de kunst van het verdwalen / Tin Toeval en het geheim van tweebeenseiland
 2000 – Gouden Griffel for Voor altijd samen, amen
 2002 – Zilveren Griffel for Met de wind mee naar de zee
 2003 – Woutertje Pieterse Prijs for Ik ben Polleke hoor!
 2005 – Gouden Griffel for Het boek van alle dingen
 2005 – Gouden Uil jeugdliteratuurprijs for Het boek van alle dingen
 2007 – E. du Perronprijs for Hoe een klein rotgodje god vermoordde (2006) and Het doden van een mens (2007)
 2012 – Astrid Lindgren Memorial Award

See also

References

External links 
 Guus Kuijer

Dutch children's writers
20th-century Dutch novelists
20th-century Dutch male writers
21st-century Dutch novelists
Dutch male novelists
Astrid Lindgren Memorial Award winners
Writers from Amsterdam
1942 births
Living people
21st-century Dutch male writers
Woutertje Pieterse Prize winners
Gouden Griffel winners